Wea may refer to:
 Wea, a former Native American tribe in Indiana, United States
 Wea, Kansas, United States
 We`a, a town in Djibouti

WEA may refer to:

Places
 W.E.A., residential area in Karol Bagh, Delhi, India
 West End Avenue in Manhattan, New York

Transport
 Parker County Airport near Weatherford, Texas, United States; IATA airport code and FAA location identifier
 West Ealing railway station in Ealing, London (National Rail station code WEA)

Organizations
 Wanganui East Athletic, a New Zealand association football club
 Warner Records, formerly with imprint WEA
 Washington Education Association
 WEA International (named after the Warner Bros., Elektra, and Atlantic record labels), a former name of Warner Music Group
 Werner Erhard and Associates, a company offering training in self-transformation
 White Eagle Aviation, a Polish airline
 Workers' Educational Association, an organization involved in adult education in the UK, Australia and New Zealand
 World Evangelical Alliance, a network of evangelical organizations

Technology
 Wireless Emergency Alerts, an alerting network designed to disseminate emergency alerts